Eleanor: The Years Alone  is a 1972 biography of Eleanor Roosevelt written by Joseph P. Lash. It is a companion volume to Eleanor and Franklin (1971), which covers her life through the death of her husband, United States President Franklin D. Roosevelt. Eleanor: The Years Alone describes her life thereafter.

Bibliography 

 
 
 
 
 Book Review Digest 1972, p. 763 (and 1973)

External links 

 Full text at the Internet Archive

1972 non-fiction books
Biographies of Franklin D. Roosevelt
Eleanor Roosevelt
English-language books
W. W. Norton & Company books